The Chicago, Fort Wayne and Eastern Railroad  is a short line railroad offering service from Tolleston, Indiana to Crestline, Ohio, United States over the former Fort Wayne Line of the Pennsylvania Railroad. It began operations in 2004 as a division of the Central Railroad of Indianapolis (CERA), under the overall corporate ownership of RailAmerica. CFE operates  of rail leased from CSX.

History
Conrail acquired the line in 1976, and later sold some of it to the Norfolk Southern Railway to relieve that company's ex-Nickel Plate Road main line. CSX Transportation acquired the entire line in the 1999 breakup of Conrail, and began to make improvements, including new crossing signals, paving crossings, and weeding the railroad. After this was complete, signs were posted at each crossing notifying motorists of an increase in train traffic.

In 2004, operations under the Chicago, Fort Wayne and Eastern Railroad name began; from the beginning of operations, the railroad has been owned by RailAmerica.
In 2011 former Norfolk Southern supervisor Joseph (Joe) Parsons was named the General Manager of Chicago, Fort Wayne, & Eastern Railroad headquartered in Fort Wayne, Indiana.

On July 23, 2012, Genesee & Wyoming Inc. announced that it intended to purchase RailAmerica in a deal valued at $1.39 billion. Approval of the purchase was granted by the U.S. Surface Transportation Board on December 19, 2012, and ownership of the Chicago, Fort Wayne and Eastern was transferred to the G&W.

Traffic
Traffic on the line includes grain, lumber products, chemicals, steel, and petroleum. The CFE transported around 39,000 carloads in 2008.

References

External links

Chicago Fort Wayne and Eastern Railroad official webpage - Genesee & Wyoming website

Illinois railroads
Indiana railroads
Ohio railroads
Railway companies established in 2004
RailAmerica
Spin-offs of CSX Transportation